Squirrelz With Gunz is a compilation of tracks produced by Chemo released July 2007. It is the first Solo release by Chemo.

Track listing
   Intro - DJ Skully  	
   Karma - Karizma 	
   Divine Communication - Kashmere & Iron Braydz
   New Day - Toplinerz 	
   Sin City - Kyza & D.Ablo 	
   5 7 - Tony D & The Therapist 	
   Heard About Me - Ali Vegas 	
   Heresy - Triple Darkeness & Kyza 	
   For Heaven's Sake - Kashmere 	
   Cold - Skriblah & M9 	
   Soul Survive - Verb T 	
   City Of Satan - Manage & CLG 	
   Snakes And Ladders - Triple Darkness 	
   Here I Am - Poisonous Poets 	
   Paranoid Music - Mr. Dragstick & Stylah, Iron Braydz
   Speaker's Corner - Manage & Guests 	
   Firey Red - Blind Alphabetz & Sean Price
   Not In My Name - Chain Of Command 	
   Fight Klub - Kyza 	
   Give It Up - Mr. Drastick 	
   Sitting Here - Magda Sinit

References

2007 albums